Jane Smith (born 25 November 1975) is an English former diver, who won bronze medals in the 1m and 3m springboard events at the 2002 Commonwealth Games. She also competed for Great Britain at the 2000 and 2004 Summer Olympics. Smith competed for the City of Sheffield diving club.

Career
Smith won the 1998 edition of Gladiators and the 1999 "Champion of Champions" event. At the 2000 Summer Olympics, Smith and Tandi Gerrard finished 14th in the 3m synchronised diving event. Smith was forced to miss the 2001 Diving World Championships due to shoulder surgery. At the 2002 Commonwealth Games, Smith won bronze medals in the 1m and 3m springboard events. Her 3m springboard medal was the first medal for an English woman at the Games. Smith also competed at the 2004 Summer Olympics, where she finished fourth in the 3m synchronised diving event with Gerrard, and did not qualify for the final of the 3m springboard event. Smith announced her retirement from diving in January 2005.

References

External links
 

British female divers
Sportspeople from Sheffield
1975 births
Divers at the 2002 Commonwealth Games
Olympic divers of Great Britain
Divers at the 2000 Summer Olympics
Divers at the 2004 Summer Olympics
Gladiators (1992 British TV series)
Commonwealth Games medallists in diving
Commonwealth Games bronze medallists for England
Living people
Medallists at the 2002 Commonwealth Games